Hello My Teacher (lit. Biscuit Teacher and Star Candy) is a 2005 South Korean television series starring Gong Hyo-jin, Gong Yoo, Kim Da-hyun, and Choi Yeo-jin. It aired on SBS from April 13 to June 2, 2005 on Wednesdays and Thursdays at 21:55 for 16 episodes.

Synopsis
Na Bo-ri (Gong Hyo-jin) is a 25-year-old woman who desperately wants to be a teacher at the high school she was kicked out of due to a misunderstanding with her teachers over injuring a group of male classmates (she had been a legend there for being a troublemaker and getting into fights). After overcoming numerous hardships and getting her high-school equivalency certification, she rejects job offers from other high schools and works on becoming a substitute teacher at her old high school so she can work side by side with her longtime high school crush, the art teacher Ji Hyun-woo (Kim Da-hyun).

However, the only thing that enables her to get the coveted job is by signing a contract to essentially babysit Park Tae-in (Gong Yoo), a troublemaker who attends the same high school. Tae-in, a lonely 20-year-old youth, quickly becomes the "jjang", or "king" of the high school, and enjoys playing mean tricks on Bo-ri whose tough but easygoing personality attracts the majority of her students. As his relationship with his teacher takes a turn for the worse, Tae-in gradually becomes attracted to her through a series of complicated events. Noh Jem-ma (Choi Yeo-jin) is jealous of the relationship between Bo-ri and Tae-in, and goes out of her way to get Bo-ri kicked out but she's not the only one against them.

Cast

Main
Gong Hyo-jin as Na Bo-ri
Gong Yoo as Park Tae-in
Kim Da-hyun as Ji Hyun-woo
Choi Yeo-jin as Noh Jem-ma

Supporting

Family members
Lee Yoon-ji as Na Seon-jae (Bo-ri's younger sister)
Yang Geum-seok as Ji Young-ae (Tae-in's stepmother)
Lee Hyo-jung as Park Joong-seop (Tae-in's father)
Oh Yoon-ah as Chae Eun-seong
Geum Bo-ra as Bae Yi-da (Bo-ri's mother)
Seo Jun-young as Park Jae-in (Tae-in's half-brother)
Lee Jae-yong as monk (Bo-ri's father)

Teachers
Jo Hyung-ki as Dong Chil-hwan (principal)
Park In-hwan as Hwang Gap-soo (Homeroom teacher)
Jo Sang-ki as Nam Seong-ki (Biology teacher)
Kim Yoon-kyung as Oh Joo-yeon (English teacher)
Hyun Young as Jo Ji-ah (PE teacher)
Jeon Jae-hyung

Students
Jung Eui-chul as Choi Chang-il
Jung Gyu-woon as Lee Ho-joon
Go Joon-hee as Kim Sun-ah
Jang Hee-jin as Oh Eun-byul
Kang Do-han as Lee Yoo-jin
Yang Joo-ho as Kim Yeong-song
Lee Eun as Yeo Se-ra
Jo Han-na as Bae Pil-soon
Cha Seo-rin as Lee Hye-bin
Shin Ah as Kang Ri-ping
Park Ki-young as Bang Soo-hyun
Shin Hyun-tak as Park Man-chang
Ki Moo as Choi Hoon
Jang Ji-woo as Lee Jang-baek
Nam Chang-hee as Kim Baek-joon
Song Jin-yeong as Jo Pil
Yoo Da-in as Da-in
Park Hyo-jun as Oh Sang-tae
Hahm Eun-jung as suicidal honor student
Kim Hwa-joo

Notes

References

External links
Biscuit Teacher and Star Candy official SBS website 

Seoul Broadcasting System television dramas
2005 South Korean television series debuts
2005 South Korean television series endings
Korean-language television shows
South Korean romantic comedy television series
Television series by IHQ (company)